Calosoma marginatum is a species of ground beetle in the family Carabidae. It is found in Kazakhstan and China.

Subspecies
These two subspecies belong to the species Calosoma marginatum:
 Calosoma marginatum marginatum Gebler, 1830  (Kazakhstan)
 Calosoma marginatum pseudocarabus Semenov & Redikorzev, 1928  (China and Kazakhstan)

References

Calosoma